Blessed Serapion of Vladimir (d. 1275) was a bishop of Vladimir. 
He was Archimandrite of the Kiev Monastery of the Caves from 1247 until 1274, and was bishop of the diocese of Vladimir, Suzdal and Nizhny Novgorod from 1274 until his death the following year.
The territory of the diocese at the time consisted of the Grand Duchy of Vladimir and the principalities of Gorodets, Kostroma, Moscow, Pereslavl, Starodub, Suzdal, Nizhny Novgorod and Yuriev.

Five sermons by Serapion have been preserved. His main theme is the disaster of the Mongol invasion, seen as divine punishment for Russia because if its people's sins. 
Four of the sermons appear to have been written in 1274/5, when he was bishop. The fifth is presumably older, and was most likely written shortly after   the destruction of Kiev in 1240.
In one of his late sermons, he denounces the persecution of witches.

He is commemorated on 12 July (25 July N. S.).

References

"Serapion of Vladimir" in The Oxford Dictionary of Byzantium (1991)
"Serapion of Vladimir (1275)" in The Oxford Dictionary of the Middle Ages  (2010)

External links
History of Russian Literature

1275 deaths
Bishops of the Russian Orthodox Church